VLocity may refer to:
 V/Line VLocity, a diesel multiple unit train
 VLocity 64-7.0, a standard edition release of VectorLinux

See also
 Velocity (disambiguation)